The Process may refer to:

The Process (novel), by Brion Gysin
The Process (Skinny Puppy album), a 1996 album by industrial band Skinny Puppy 
The Process, a 2000 album by Brave Combo
The Process (Play-N-Skillz album), a 2005 album by rap group Play-N-Skillz
The Process (band), an American music group
The Process (collective), an art and philosophy collective formed in the early 1990s
The Process Church of The Final Judgment,  a religious group that flourished in the 1960s and 1970s
The Process (Philadelphia 76ers), a reference to the rebuilding phase of the NBA's Philadelphia 76ers in the mid-2010s

People
Joel Embiid, a Cameroonian basketball player in the NBA, a reference to being part of the 76ers' "Process"

See also
Process (disambiguation)
The Trial by Franz Kafka (in German: Der Process)
Process thinking, a philosophy often referred to as "the process"
Sam Hinkie
"Part of the Process", a 1998 song by Morcheeba